Bodashtart (also transliterated Bodʿaštort, meaning "from the hand of Astarte") was a Phoenician ruler, who reigned as King of Sidon ( – ), the grandson of King Eshmunazar I, and a vassal of the Achaemenid Empire. He succeeded his cousin Eshmunazar II to the throne of Sidon, and scholars believe that he was succeeded by his son and proclaimed heir Yatonmilk.

Bodashtart was a prolific builder, and his name is attested on some 30 eponymous inscriptions found at the Temple of Eshmun and elsewhere in the hinterland of the city of Sidon in Lebanon. The earliest discovered of Bodashtart's inscriptions was excavated in Sidon in 1858 and was donated to the Louvre. This inscription dates back to the first year of Bodashtart's accession to the throne of Sidon and commemorates the building of a temple to the goddess Astarte. The Temple of Eshmun podium inscriptions were discovered between 1900 and 1922 and are classified into two groups. The inscriptions of the first group, known as KAI 15, commemorate building activities in the temple and attribute the work to Bodashtart. The second group of inscriptions, known as KAI 16, were found on podium restoration blocks; they credit Bodashtart and his son Yatonmilk with the construction project and emphasize Yatonmilk's legitimacy as heir. The most recently discovered inscription as of 2020 was found in the 1970s on the bank of the Bostrenos River, not far from the Temple of Eshmun. The inscription credits the King with the building of water canals to supply the temple in the seventh year of his reign. 

Three of Bodashtart's Eshmun temple inscriptions have been left in place; the others are housed in museums in Paris, Istanbul, and Beirut. Bodashtart is believed to have reigned for at least seven years, as evidenced by the Bostrenos River bank inscription. Little is known about his reign other than what has been learned from his dedicatory inscriptions.

Etymology 
The name Bodashtart is the Latinized form of the Phoenician , meaning "from the hand of Astarte". Spellings of the King's name include: Bdʿštrt, Bad-ʿAštart, Bodʿashtart, Bodʿastart, Bodaštart, Bodʿaštort, Bodachtart, and Bodashtort.

Chronology 
The absolute chronology of the kings of Sidon from the dynasty of Eshmunazar I has been much discussed in the literature; traditionally placed in the course of the fifth century, inscriptions of this dynasty have been dated back to an earlier period on the basis of numismatic, historical, and archaeological evidence. The most complete work addressing the dates of the reigns of these Sidonian kings is by the French historian Josette Elayi who shifted away from the use of biblical chronology. Elayi used all the available documentation of the time and included inscribed Tyrian seals and stamps excavated by the Lebanese archaeologist Maurice Chehab in 1972 from Jal el-Bahr, a neighborhood in the north of Tyre, Phoenician inscriptions discovered by the French archaeologist Maurice Dunand in Sidon in 1965, and the systematic study of Sidonian coins, which were the first coins to bear minting dates in antiquity based on the years of reign of the Sidonian kings. Elayi placed the reigns of the descendants of Eshmunazar I between the middle and the end of the sixth century; according to her work, Bodashtart reigned from 525 BC to 515 BC.

Historical context 

Sidon, which was a flourishing and independent Phoenician city-state, came under Mesopotamian occupation in the ninth century BC. The Assyrian king Ashurnasirpal II (883–859 BC) conquered the Lebanon mountain range and its coastal cities, including Sidon. In 705, King Luli joined forces with the Egyptians and Judah in an unsuccessful rebellion against Assyrian rule, but was forced to flee to Kition with the arrival of the Assyrian army headed by Sennacherib. Sennacherib instated Ittobaal on the throne of Sidon and reimposed the annual tribute. When Abdi-Milkutti ascended to Sidon's throne in 680 BC, he also rebelled against the Assyrians. In response, the Assyrian king Esarhaddon captured and beheaded Abdi-Milkutti in 677 BC after a three-year siege; Sidon was stripped of its territory, which was awarded to Baal I, the king of rival Tyre, and loyal vassal of Esarhaddon.  

Sidon returned to its former level of prosperity while Tyre was besieged for 13 years (586–573 BC) by the Chaldean king Nebuchadnezzar II. After the Achaemenid conquest in 539 BC, Phoenicia was divided into four vassal kingdoms: Sidon, Tyre, Byblos and Arwad. Eshmunazar I, a priest of Astarte and the founder of his namesake dynasty, became King of Sidon around the time of the Achaemenid conquest of the Levant. During the first phase of Achaemenid rule, Sidon flourished and reclaimed its former standing as Phoenicia's chief city, and the Sidonian kings began an extensive program of mass-scale construction projects, as attested in the Eshmunazar II sarcophagus and Bodashtart inscriptions.

Epigraphic sources 
 Bodashtart was a prolific builder who carved his eponymous inscriptions found at the Temple of Eshmun and elsewhere in the hinterland of the city of Sidon in Lebanon. The earliest discovered of the inscriptions, known today as CIS I 4, was found during excavations in Sidon in 1858. It was donated by French archaeologist Melchior de Vogüé to the Louvre where it is housed today. The interpretation of inscription CIS I 4 is still a matter of debate; some scholars construe the text as a commemoration of building a temple to Astarte during the first year of Bodashtart's reign, while others posit that the text records the dedication of the Sharon plain to the temple of said goddess.

The Sidonian king carried out an extensive expansion and restoration project of the Temple of Eshmun, where he left some 30 dedicatory Phoenician inscriptions at the temple site that are divided into two groups belonging to two construction phases. The first phase of the construction project involved adding a second podium at the base of the temple. During this construction phase, a first group of inscriptions (known as KAI 15) were carved on the added podium's foundation stones. These inscriptions commemorate the construction project and attribute the work to Bodashtart alone. The second set of inscriptions (KAI 16) was placed on ashlar restoration stones. The KAI 16 inscriptions mention Bodashtart and his son Yatonmilk, emphasize the latter's legitimacy as heir, and assign him a share of credit for the construction project. Yatonmilk is believed to have succeeded Bodashtart to the throne of Sidon as is inferred from the Bodashtart inscriptions. There is no further extant literary or archaeological evidence left by Yatonmilk himself.The KAI 15 and KAI 16 inscriptions were excavated from the Temple of Eshmun site between 1900 and 1922. Three of these inscriptions were left  while the rest were removed to the Louvre, the Istanbul Archaeology Museums, and the Archaeological Museum of the American University of Beirut.

According to the American archaeologist and historian Charles Torrey and the Polish biblical scholar Milik, the Bodashtart's KAI 15 inscriptions commemorate the building of the Eshmun temple and indicate the names of the quarters and territories of the Kingdom of Sidon. Torrey interpreted the inscription thus: "The king, Bad-ʿAštart, king of the Sidonians, grandson of king ʾEšmunazar, king of the Sidonians; reigning in [or ruling over] Sidon-on-the-Sea, High-Heavens, [and] Rešep District, belonging to Sidon; who built this house like the eyrie of an eagle; (he) built it for his god Ešmun, the Holy Lord [Prince]."

The KAI 16 Bodashtart inscriptions read: "King BDʿŠTRT and the legitimate (ṣdq) son, YTNMLK, King of the Sidonians, grandson of King Eshmunazor, King of the Sidonians, built this temple for the god ʾEšhmun, the holy prince". Another translation reads: "King Bodashtart, and his pious son (or legitimate successor), Yatonmilk, king of the Sidonians, descendants (bn bn) of King Eshmunazar, king of the Sidonians, this house he built to his god, to Eshmun, lord/god of the sanctuary".

The inscription credits Bodashtart with the building water installations to supply the temple and dates the work to the seventh year of his reign, which indicates that he ruled for at least this length of time.

Apart from inscriptions detailing Bodashtart's building activity, little is known about his reign.

Genealogy 
Bodashtart was a descendant of Eshmunazar I's dynasty. Eshmunazar's heir was his son Tabnit, who fathered Eshmunazar II from his sister Amoashtart. Tabnit died before the birth of Eshmunazar II, and Amoashtart ruled in the interlude until the birth of her son, then was co-regent until he reached adulthood. Bodashtart was the nephew of Tabnit and Amoashtart and acceded to the throne after the death of Eshmunazar II at the young age of fourteen. Some scholars misidentified Yatonmilk as the father of Bodashtart; this was successfully contested by later epigraphists.

See also 
 King of Sidon – A list of the ancient rulers of the city of Sidon

Notes

References

Bibliography 
 
 
 
 
 
 
 
 
 
 
 
 
 
 
 
 
 
 
 
 
 
 
 
 
 
 
 
 
 
 
 
 
 
 
 
 
 
 
 
 
 

6th-century BC rulers
Kings of Sidon
Rulers in the Achaemenid Empire
6th-century BC Phoenician people